is an underground metro station located in Naka-ku, Nagoya, Aichi Prefecture, Japan operated by the Nagoya Municipal Subway. It is an interchange station between the Tsurumai Line and the Meijō Line, and is located 8.8 rail kilometers from the terminus of the Tsurumai Line at Kami-Otai Station and 1.6 rail kilometers from the terminus of the Meijō Line at Kanayama Station.

The station is located in the south eastern corner of the Osu Shopping Arcade area (大須商店街、Ōsu Shōtengai).

History
Kamemaezu Station was opened on 30 March 1967 as a station on the Meijō Line. The Tsurumai Line connected to the station on 18 March 1977.

Lines
 
 (Station number: T09)
 (Station number: M03)

Layout
Kamimaezu Station has two pairs of underground opposed side platforms.

Platforms

References

External links

 Ran no Yakata 

Railway stations in Japan opened in 1967
Railway stations in Aichi Prefecture